The 12th National Basketball Association All-Star Game was played on January 16, 1962, in St. Louis.The coaches were Red Auerbach for the East, and Fred Schaus for the West.

Western Conference

Eastern Conference

Score by Periods
 

Halftime— West, 64-60
Third Quarter— West, 105-94
Officials: 
Attendance: 15,112.

References

National Basketball Association All-Star Game
All-Star Game
Sports competitions in St. Louis
1960s in St. Louis
January 1962 sports events in the United States
1962 in sports in Missouri